A twelve-string guitar (or 12-string guitar) is a steel-string guitar with 12 strings in six courses, which produces a thicker, more ringing tone than a standard six-string guitar. Typically, the strings of the lower four courses are tuned in octaves, with those of the upper two courses tuned in unison. The gap between the strings within each dual-string course is narrow, and the strings of each course are fretted and plucked as a single unit. The neck is wider, to accommodate the extra strings, and is similar to the width of a classical guitar neck. The sound, particularly on acoustic instruments, is fuller and more harmonically resonant than six-string instruments. The 12-string guitar can be played like a 6-string guitar as players still use the same notes, chords and guitar techniques like a standard 6-string guitar, but advanced techniques might be tough as players need to play or pluck two strings simultaneously.

Structurally, 12-string guitars, especially those built before 1970, differ from six-string guitars in the following ways:
The headstock is elongated to accommodate 12 tuning machines.
The added tension of the six additional strings necessitates stronger reinforcement of the neck.
The body is also reinforced, and built with a stronger structure, to withstand the higher tension.
The fretting scale is generally shorter to reduce the overall string tension.

Twelve-string guitars are made in both acoustic and electric forms. However, the acoustic type is more common.

"Chorus" effect

The double ranks of strings of the 12-string guitar produce a shimmering effect, because even the strings tuned in unison can never vibrate with precise simultaneity—that is, they vibrate out of phase. The result to the ear is a sound that seems to "shimmer", which some describe as resembling strings that are slightly detuned. The interference between the out-of-phase vibrations produces a phenomenon known as a beat that results in a periodic rise and fall of intensity that is, in music, often considered pleasing to the ear. Pete Seeger described the distinctive sound of the 12-string guitar as "the clanging of bells."

Origin and history
The origin of the modern 12-string guitar is not clear, but it arose in the closing years of the 19th Century. The most likely ancestors using courses of doubled strings are some Mexican instruments of Spanish ancestry such as the bandolón, the guitarra séptima, the guitarra quinta huapanguera, and the bajo sexto. Pictures such as the 1901 Mexican Typical Orchestra at the Pan-American Exposition show a guitar with 12 strings. At the end of the 19th century, the archtop mandolin was one of the first instruments with courses of doubled strings designed in the United States.

In the 19th and early 20th centuries, 12-strings were regarded as "novelty" instruments. The 12-string guitar did not become a major part of blues and folk music till the 1920s and the 1930s, when their "larger than life" sound made them ideal as solo accompaniment for vocalists, especially Lead Belly and Blind Willie McTell. The 12-string guitar has since occupied roles in certain varieties of folk, rock, jazz, and popular music. 
In the 1930s, Mexican-American guitarist and singer Lydia Mendoza popularized the instrument. In the 1950s, Lead Belly's protégé, Fred Gerlach, brought the instrument into the American folk music world. Initially, it was primarily used for accompaniment, owing to the greater difficulty of picking or executing string "bends" on its double-strung courses. The Delta Blues guitar virtuoso Robert Lockwood Jr was presented a handcrafted acoustic 12-string guitar made by an outstanding Japanese luthier in the end of the sixties, and this became the instrument of choice for Lockwood thereafter. In the later 20th century, however, a number of players devoted themselves to producing solo performances on the 12-string guitar, including Leo Kottke, Peter Lang, John McLaughlin, Larry Coryell, Ralph Towner, Robbie Basho, Jack Rose, and James Blackshaw.

Electric 12-string guitars

Electric 12-strings became a staple in pop and rock music in the 1960s. Early use of the instrument was pioneered by the guitarists of The Wrecking Crew; in 1963, Carol Kaye used a converted Guild six-string on The Crystals' hit "Then He Kissed Me," and on Jackie DeShannon's song "When You Walk in the Room," Glen Campbell played a well-known guitar figure, composed by DeShannon, on an electric 12-string.

One of the first mass-produced electric 12-strings was the Bellzouki. Introduced by Danelectro in 1961, from a design by session guitarist Vinnie Bell, it was initially considered a cross between an electric guitar and a bouzouki rather than an electric version of the traditional 12-string guitar. In the UK in 1963, JMI briefly produced the Vox Bouzouki, later produced in Italy as The Vox Tempest XII, which was used by Vic Flick on the Peter and Gordon hit single "A World Without Love" in 1964. In late 1963, Burns developed the Double Six, supplying a prototype to Hank Marvin of The Shadows, who used it on a number of songs for the soundtrack of the 1964 Cliff Richard movie Wonderful Life; the Double Six was also used on The Searchers' cover version of De Shannon's "When You Walk in the Room."

The electric 12-string gained prominence with the introduction in 1964 of the Rickenbacker 360, made famous through George Harrison's use of it on The Beatles' album A Hard Day's Night and many subsequent recordings. In 1965, inspired by Harrison, Roger McGuinn made the Rickenbacker 12-string central to The Byrds' folk rock sound, further popularising the instrument. By the mid-1960s, most major guitar manufacturers were producing competing instruments, including the Fender Electric XII (used by Roy Wood of The Move), and the Vox Phantom XII (used by Tony Hicks of The Hollies). Gretsch, Guild, and Gibson also produced electric 12-string models from the mid-Sixties and following decades, with Gretsch promoting theirs by supplying a number of custom made 12-strings for The Monkees guitarist Michael Nesmith, for use on The Monkees TV series.

Standard electric 12-strings became less popular with the end of the American folk rock scene in the late sixties; Fender and Gibson ceased production of the Electric XII and ES-335 12-string variant respectively, in 1969. However, from the 1970s, some progressive rock, hard rock, and jazz fusion guitarists, most notably Jimmy Page of Led Zeppelin, Don Felder of the Eagles, John McLaughlin of The Mahavishnu Orchestra and Alex Lifeson of Rush used double-necked guitars such as the Gibson EDS-1275, with six-string and 12-string necks, for live appearances, allowing easy transition between different sounds mid-song.

The post punk era of the late '70s and early '80s saw a resurgence of electric 12-string guitar use among '60s-influenced alternative rock, pop, and indie guitarists. Players such as Johnny Marr of The Smiths, Dave Gregory of XTC, Susanna Hoffs of The Bangles, Marty Willson-Piper of The Church, Peter Buck of R.E.M., and Tom Petty and Mike Campbell of Tom Petty and the Heartbreakers often chose 12-strings (particularly Rickenbackers) for many songs.

Design
The strings are placed in courses of two strings each that are usually played together. The two strings in each of the lower four courses are normally tuned an octave apart, while each pair of strings in the top two courses are tuned in unison. The strings are generally arranged such that the higher string of each pair is struck first on a downward strum. However, Rickenbacker usually reverses this arrangement on its electric 12-string guitars. The tuning of the second string in the third course (G) varies. Some players use a unison string, while most prefer the distinctive high-pitched, bell-like quality an octave string makes in this position. Another common variant is to tune the octave string in the sixth (lowest) course two octaves above the lower string, rather than one. Some players, either in search of distinctive tone or for ease of playing, remove some doubled strings. For example, removing the higher octave from the three bass courses simplifies playing running bass lines, but keeps the extra treble strings for the full strums. Some manufacturers have produced 9-string instruments based on this setup, in which either the lower three courses are undoubled, or the upper three courses are undoubled.

The extra tension placed on the instrument by the doubled strings is high, and because of this additional stress on their necks and soundboards, 12-string guitars long had a reputation for warping after a few years of use. (This is less of a problem in modern instruments, built after 1970.) Until the invention of the truss rod in 1921, 12-string guitars were frequently tuned lower than the traditional EADGBE to reduce the stresses on the instrument. Lead Belly often used a low-C tuning, but in some recordings, his tunings can be recognized as low-B and A tunings. Some 12-string guitars have nontraditional structural supports to prevent or postpone warping, at the expense of appearance and tone. To additionally reduce string tension, 12-string guitars built prior to 1970 typically had shorter necks and scale lengths than six-string guitars, which made frets more closely spaced. Their bridges, especially in acoustic guitars, had a larger reinforcement plate for the same reason.

Advances in materials, design, and construction in such guitars made after 1970 have eliminated most of these accommodations. Contemporary 12 string guitars are commonly built to the same dimensions and scale as their six-string counterparts.

Tuning

Lead Belly and some other players have doubled the lowest course two octaves above instead of one, producing a third string in unison with the top course.

Some performers use open tunings and other non-standard guitar tunings on 12-string guitars. Some performers have experimented with tuning the two strings within a course to intervals other than octaves or unisons: jazz guitarists such as Ralph Towner (of Oregon), Larry Coryell, and Philip Catherine have tuned the bass courses of their 12-string guitars to the upper fifths and trebles to the lower fourths instead of octaves and unisons; Michael Gulezian tuned strings in the top two courses to whole-tone intervals (and possibly some of the other strings an octave lower) to achieve a very rich, complex sound. The greater number of strings offers almost endless possibilities.

Nashville tuning
Nashville Tuning is a way of simulating a 12-string guitar sound, using two six-string guitars playing in unison. This is achieved by replacing the lower four courses on one six-string with the higher octave strings for those four courses from a 12-string set, and tuning these four strings an octave higher than normal tuning for those courses on a six-string. Double-tracking this guitar with the standard-tuned six-string is commonly used in recording studios to achieve a "cleaner" 12-string effect.

Playing
The 12-string guitar's greater number of strings and higher cumulative string tension complicates playing, in both hands. Fretting chords requires greater force, and the width of the neck and the added string tension combine to make soloing and string-bending challenging. The gap between the dual-string courses is usually narrower than that between the single-string courses of a conventional six-string guitar, so more precision is required with the pick or fingertip when not simply strumming chords. Consequently, the instrument is most commonly used for accompaniment, though several players have taken the time to develop the 12-string guitar as a solo instrument. Flat-picking solos are more frequently seen with electric players, whereas a few acoustic players, such as Leo Kottke, have adapted fingerstyle techniques to the instrument; players such as Ralph Towner have applied classical playing techniques.

See also
Colombian tiple
Twelve-string bass
Portuguese guitar
Viola caipira

References

External links
Vintage Guitar Museum
The Birth of the American 12-string Guitar

Guitars
Acoustic guitars
Electric guitars